Chambers County School District  is a school district in Chambers County, Alabama.

References

External links
 

School districts in Alabama